The Salisbury Roller Girls (SRG) is a flat track roller derby league based in Salisbury, Maryland. Founded in 2010, the league consists of two teams which compete against teams from other leagues. Salisbury is a member of the Women's Flat Track Derby Association (WFTDA).

History
The league was founded by Eva "Buster Skull" Paxton, who had become a fan of roller derby after hearing about the sport on Miami Ink. She trained with the Diamond State Roller Girls for a year following her eighteenth birthday, but then founded a league in her hometown early in 2010.

Salisbury hosted its first bout in March 2011, an intraleague contest between the Wicomikazis and Old Bay Bombers.  The Wicomikazis later became its B team.  By 2012, it was playing a full season, which it finished with a 6 to 1 winning record.

Salisbury was accepted as a member of the Women's Flat Track Derby Association Apprentice Program in July 2012, and it became a full Women's Flat Track Derby Association member in September 2013.

WFTDA rankings

References

Roller derby leagues established in 2010
Roller derby leagues in Maryland
Salisbury, Maryland
Women's Flat Track Derby Association Division 3
2010 establishments in Maryland